= University of Toronto Space Design Contest =

The University of Toronto Space Design Contest, or UTSDC is an annual contest for high school students founded in 2003. Teams work together to develop a solution for a design challenge, set every year. The contest was founded to promote awareness of space exploration and development, as well as to excite students about new, creative applications of science, technology and engineering. The contest runs year long and ends in a Design Fair and Conference held on the University of Toronto's St. George Campus in mid May.

== History ==
The inaugural UTSDC 2004-2005 had 30 teams signing up, most of these teams are based in Toronto, some teams in other regions of Ontario. However, only 15 of these teams official participated in the contest and the Design Fair and Conference.

The Space Design contest continues to grow, attracting participants from a wider geographic area, such as Waterloo, Ottawa, Florida and recently India.
